The 1921 Primera División was the inaugural season of the Costa Rican Primera División, the top division of Costa Rican football.  The league was formed on 13 June.  The first match was played on 3 July between S.G. Limonense and C.S. La Libertad which ended in a 0–1 win to the away team.

Standings

References

External links
 Official website

1921